The North Luzon Expressway (NLEX), signed as E1 of the Philippine expressway network, partially as N160 of the Philippine highway network, and R-8 of the Metro Manila arterial road network, is a limited-access toll expressway that connects Metro Manila to the provinces of the Central Luzon region in the Philippines. Ines Interchange to its southern terminus in Balintawak Interchange, which is adjacent to its connection to Skyway, an elevated toll road that connects the NLEX to its counterpart in the south, the South Luzon Expressway. The segment of the expressway between Santa Rita Exit in Guiguinto and the Balintawak Interchange in Quezon City is part of Asian Highway 26 of the Asian highway network.

The expressway also serves as a major utility corridor, carrying various high voltage overhead power lines through densely populated areas where acquisition and designation of right of way or power line alignment and lands for their associated structures is impractical. A notable power line using the expressway's right of way for most or part of the route is the Hermosa–Duhat–Balintawak transmission line from San Fernando Exit in San Fernando, Pampanga to Smart Connect Interchange in Valenzuela, Metro Manila.

The North Luzon Expressway was built in the 1960s as part of the government's program to develop areas adjacent to Metro Manila, with NLEX serving the north. The expressway was originally controlled by the Philippine National Construction Corporation (PNCC), until the expressway's operations and maintenance was transferred in February 10, 2005, to the NLEX Corporation, a subsidiary of Metro Pacific Investments Corporation (a former subsidiary of the Lopez Group of Companies until 2008). The expressway was expanded and rehabilitated from 2003 to February 2005, modernizing the road and its facilities.

Route description

NLEX Main 

The North Luzon Expressway's main segment, called the North Luzon Tollway (NLT) or NLEX Main, cuts northwards from Manila to the provinces in Central Luzon.

The expressway begins in Quezon City as a four lane road at the Balintawak Interchange with EDSA as a continuation of A. Bonifacio Avenue. The main segment spans , passing through Caloocan and Valenzuela in Metro Manila and the provinces of Bulacan and Pampanga in Central Luzon. It currently ends in Mabalacat. The NLEX runs parallel to the MacArthur Highway, which is officially known as the Manila North Road.

From Balintawak, the NLEX follows a straight north route, with sections lined by billboards. Two service roads run on either sides of the expressway from Balintawak to Barangay Lias, Marilao, albeit discontinuously and one service road on the west from Marilao Exit to Duhat, Bocaue. The N160 concurrency ends near the Eternal Gardens Memorial Park in Caloocan, just below Skyway and its Balintawak Exit and few meters south of the former site of Balintawak toll plaza that operated until 2005. The expressway then bends westward at Smart Connect Interchange in Valenzuela and in Tambubong Interchange in Bocaue, Bulacan. The following exit, Tabang, leads passengers to the Tabang Spur Road. The Tabang Spur Road is a four-lane,  spur road in Bulacan that branches off NLEX Main at Tabang Exit in Balagtas and terminates at a partial cloverleaf interchange with MacArthur Highway and Cagayan Valley Road at Guiguinto Exit in Guiguinto. The spur road carried the final leg of the expressway until the present route was extended to Pampanga.

The expressway narrows to three lanes per direction past Tabang Exit. It continues on a straight route, traversing paddy fields on the outskirts of Guiguinto, Malolos, and Pulilan. The Asian Highway 26 (AH26) concurrency leaves NLEX at Santa Rita Exit, where it follows Maharlika Highway, also known as Cagayan Valley Road, towards Baliwag and Cagayan Valley. A few meters after Pulilan Exit is the Candaba Viaduct (officially known as Pulilan-Apalit Bridge). The bridge traverses rice paddies and swampland in the municipalities of Pulilan, Calumpit, Bulacan and Apalit, Pampanga, and crosses Pampanga River before the viaduct ends. The expressway continues again on a straight alignment. After San Fernando Exit, the expressway narrows into two lanes per direction. It continues a mostly straight and gently winding route through the rural areas of Mexico, crossing Abacan and Quitangil rivers, and traversing the eastern parts of Angeles and Mabalacat. NLEX connects with Subic–Clark–Tarlac Expressway via Clark Spur Road before the main line terminates at Sta. Ines Interchange, with a toll plaza serving the exit.

NLEX Harbor Link 

Collectively known as the North Luzon Expressway Harbor Link Project (NLEX Harbor Link Project), these series of expressways connect the North Luzon Expressway to various points in Metro Manila. It currently runs from Mindanao Avenue in Valenzuela to Radial Road 10 in Navotas, linking the North Luzon Expressway to the Port of Manila. Once completed, it will run from Katipunan Avenue, a component of Circumferential Road 5, in Quezon City at the east.

History

Planning and construction 

The original stretch of the expressway, from Balintawak Interchange in Quezon City up to Guiguinto Exit in Bulacan, was completed on August 4, 1968. It is a fully fenced limited-access highway that consisted of a four-lane rural divided roadway, nine twin bridges, one railroad overpass, seven underpasses, and three interchanges.

Originally a project of the Department of Public Works and Highways, the completion of the major portion of the job fell on the Construction Development Corporation of the Philippines (CDCP, the precursor to PNCC) to pioneer the toll concept of funding infrastructure. It was carried out under the private financing scheme provided by Republic Act No. 3741.

Additional work required by the government included the construction of the Balintawak – Novaliches Interchange Complex, the Tabang Interchange, and the approach road of the underpasses.
 	 	
The project features a 4-lane limited-access highway with a  Candaba Viaduct, a construction innovation utilizing precast beam system, 6 interchanges, 12 bridges, and overpass/underpass structures.

Between 1986 and 1991, under the Corazon Aquino administration, the expressway was extended by another  from its terminus at Dau Exit to Santa Ines Exit in Mabalacat, Pampanga, with a northbound lane from Dau Exit to the future connection to SCTEX had an asphalt overlay while the southbound lane was originally a concrete road before an asphalt overlay was added upon the expressway's rehabilitation. In 1998, Manila North Tollways Corporation (MNTC) was granted the concession for the expressway, manifested in a Supplementary Toll Operation Agreement (STOA). Under the STOA, the government confirmed the assignment by PNCC of its usufructuary rights, interest and privileges over the existing expressway, including all extensions, linkages and diversions in favor of MNTC. These concession rights authorized MNTC to construct, finance, manage, operate and maintain all the project roads and charge tolls thereon.

Expansion and rehabilitation 

From February 2003 to February 2005, the expressway underwent a major rehabilitation. Works included the widening of the Balintawak–Tabang segment from 6 to 8 lanes and the Tabang–Sta. Rita segment from 4 to 6 lanes, asphalt overlay, and the demolition of old tollbooths. The main contractor of the rehabilitation work was Leighton Asia with Egis Projects as the main subcontractor for the toll, telecommunication and traffic management systems. To help maintain the safety and quality of the expressway, various rules are in effect, such as restricting the left lane to passing vehicles only and banning overloaded trucks. On February 10, 2005, commercial operations began following the Toll Regulatory Board's issuance of the Toll Operation Permit. On the same day, the operation and maintenance of the expressway was transferred from the government-owned Philippine National Construction Corporation (PNCC) to the Manila North Tollways Corporation, which would later become known as NLEX Corporation.

On February 12, 2007, the entire stretch of the expressway began another rehabilitation regarding its drainage systems. Within this period, certain lanes of the road were closed to the traffic. The program was finished on October 7, 2007.

Further extensions 

On June 5, 2010, NLEX Segment 8.1 or NLEX Mindanao Avenue Link was opened. The new spur road of NLEX is a part of the C-5 Road North Extension and is built to provide another entry point to the expressway from Metro Manila and decongest Balintawak Interchange.

On March 18, 2015, NLEX Segment 9 or the NLEX Karuhatan Link was opened, providing continuation to Segment 8.1 that runs from the other side of the Smart Connect Interchange to MacArthur Highway in Karuhatan, Valenzuela.

On February 28, 2019, the main stretch of NLEX Segment 10 or the NLEX Harbor Link, from Karuhatan to C-3 Road, was opened to traffic. On February 21, 2020, its C3–R10 Section was partially opened up to its Malabon exit ramp; the remaining section to Radial Road 10 was opened on June 15, 2020.

Proposed renaming 
The main expressway has been a subject of some legislative measures for its proposed renaming. These were filed to commemorate to the historical significance and contributions of its intended namesakes, respectively. However, none has taken effect to date, as these await a counterpart measure from the Senate before it can be signed into law by the President of the Philippines.

On May 10, 2015, the House Committee on Public Works and Highways approved House Bill No. 4820 that seeks to rename the expressway to President Corazon C. Aquino Expressway (CAEX), in honor of former President Corazon Aquino, who was regarded as an icon of democracy. It was authored by Magnolia Rosa Antonino-Nadres, the then-representative from Nueva Ecija's 4th district.

On May 13, 2019, the House of Representatives passed on third and final reading the House Bill No. 8958 that seeks to rename the expressway to the Marcelo H. del Pilar Expressway (MHDPEX), in honor of Marcelo H. del Pilar, a revolutionary writer and patriot from Bulacan. The bill is principally authored by Jose Antonio Sy-Alvarado, the then-representative from Bulacan's 1st district.

Future

Sta. Ines extension 
Currently, NLEX terminates at the Sta. Ines Exit in Mabalacat, Pampanga. Plans to continue the expressway beyond have been raised over the years, with the cooperation of DPWH, to extend the Sta. Ines Interchange towards Subic–Clark–Tarlac Expressway, also in Mabalacat.

NLEX Connector 

Several plans for a construction of an elevated road to connect North Luzon Expressway (NLEX) and South Luzon Expressway (SLEX) have been mooted long before the construction of the NLEX Connector.

The government reportedly accepted an unsolicited proposal from Metro Pacific Tollways Development Corporation (MPTDC) to build the  road. MPTDC is a subsidiary of Metro Pacific Tollways Corporation (MPTC), which runs NLEX. This would later be known as the NLEX Connector Road project. The elevated expressway, which would be truck ban-free, will run over the Philippine National Railways tracks from the existing Segment 10 (Harbor Link) in Caloocan to the future interchange with Skyway Stage 3 near the Polytechnic University of the Philippines (PUP) campus in Santa Mesa, Manila. Construction of the project is estimated to cost , but as an "all-elevated" or completely grade-separated structure, right-of-way acquisition shall be reduced to an estimated cost of only . Its construction takes into consideration the upcoming parallel construction of the southern segment of the North–South Commuter Railway.

Once completed, the Connector Road will have four entry and exit points: the Caloocan Interchange, C-3 Road in Caloocan, España in Sampaloc, Manila, and Magsaysay Boulevard near Santa Mesa, Manila. Construction on Section 1, spanning  from Caloocan to España, began on February 28, 2019. , Section 1 is 94% complete and is expected to open on March 27, 2023. Construction of Section 2, spanning  from España to Santa Mesa, began on February 8, 2022 after a groundbreaking ceremony was held on December 14, 2021. The civil works are being handled by China Road and Bridge Corporation. To make way for the planned section which would traverse below LRT Line 2, the Magsaysay Flyover along Magsaysay Boulevard is currently undergoing decommissioning. , Section 2 is 29% complete, with a target completion within 2023.

NLEX Phase 3 
NLEX Phase 3 would be a  extension with three segments from NLEX Main, originally planned to be built from San Simon, Pampanga, to Dinalupihan, Bataan, connecting to the Subic Bay Freeport Zone via Subic–Clark–Tarlac Expressway. However, the plan was modified to instead start somewhere between Apalit and San Fernando in Pampanga, then cut across Guagua and end at Dinalupihan. Though the project will tentatively start from Apalit based on the concession, the new alignment has yet to be finalized.

New Manila International Airport link 
Pillars have been built on NLEX between its Balintawak toll plaza and Skyway Stage 3's Balintawak/NLEX off-ramp to accommodate a future toll road to the New Manila International Airport in Bulakan, Bulacan. The future project, to be built by San Miguel Corporation, will expand the capacity of NLEX by adding new 4–5 lanes up to Marilao, which was selected for another toll road to the future airport. After the completion of this elevated toll road, NLEX will have 11–13 lanes total (3–4 lanes per direction on NLEX + 5 lanes on the elevated segment) from Balintawak Cloverleaf to Marilao, ultimately bypassing the NLEX's open section.

The toll road project, later known as the Northern Access Link Expressway (NALEX), was approved by the Toll Regulatory Board in June 2022. Another  stretch would be built beyond the NMIA roundabout, ending at the southern end of the Tarlac–Pangasinan–La Union Expressway in Tarlac City. The NALEX project costs  and the first segment is targeted to be completed by 2026.

Tolls 

The tollway has two sections: an open section and a closed section. The open section, which is between Bocaue Exit and Balintawak Toll Barrier and the entire NLEX Harbor Link, employs the use of a barrier toll system, which charges a flat toll based on vehicle class. It is employed to reduce the number of toll barriers (and associated bottlenecks) within Metro Manila. The closed section, which is from Bocaue Exit northwards and the northbound exit to Philippine Arena (south of Bocaue), is distance-based, charging based on the class of vehicle and distance traveled. The section south of Balintawak toll barrier is toll-free, especially to vehicles travelling between Quirino Highway and Balintawak Interchange.

When the expressway was modernized, an electronic toll collection system was set up for Class 1 vehicles while prepaid magnetic cards were assigned to Class 2 and 3 vehicles to speed up transactions at toll booths. These have since been replaced by a unified ETC system operated by Easytrip Services Corporation. In accordance with law, all toll rates include a 12% Value-Added Tax (VAT). With the movement of the northernmost toll gate to Sta. Ines, the NLEX and SCTEX toll systems have been merged into one combined system, with tolls for all enclosed destinations listed.

The toll rates, implemented since May 12, 2022, are as follows:

Services

Emergency phones and parking bays 
Emergency telephone boxes are located throughout the whole length of the expressway. Parking bays (lay-bys) are also placed on regular intervals on the expressway, for use in emergency situations.

Service areas 

North Luzon Expressway has eleven service areas with 5 on both northbound and southbound of the main line, mostly located on the closed toll section north of Bocaue, and one on Tabang Spur Road. Each service station hosts a gas station, a convenience store, restrooms, car repair, and lubrication services. Except for Shell Tabang NLEX, these also have restaurants and ATMs, with some also providing ETC installation and reloading for Easytrip RFID users.

Exits 

Exit numbers are based on kilometer post. Exits begin at 10 because the NLEx is a logical continuation of A. Bonifacio Avenue. Rizal Park in Manila is designated as Kilometer Zero.

Tabang Spur Road

NLEX Connector

In popular culture 
The expressway was featured in the music video to the song "Toll Gate" by the band Hale.
It was also featured in the movie Sa North Diversion Road in 2005, based on Tony Perez's stage play of the same name. It was created by Dennis Marasigan.
From June 6–17, 2007, On North Diversion Road, the play written by Tony Perez, was performed at The Arts House, Singapore, by young & W!LD, an actor training division of Singapore's W!LD RICE Theatre.

Notes

References

External links 

Manila North Tollways Corporation
NLEX-SCTEX Toll Table Rates

Toll roads in the Philippines
Roads in Metro Manila
Roads in Bulacan
Roads in Pampanga